Robert Ashley Vines (16 January 1891 – 10 August 1977) was an Australian rules footballer who played for the University Football Club in the Victorian Football League (VFL).

Sources

Holmesby, Russell & Main, Jim (2007). The Encyclopedia of AFL Footballers. 7th ed. Melbourne: Bas Publishing.

1891 births
Australian rules footballers from Melbourne
University Football Club players
People educated at Scotch College, Melbourne
1977 deaths
People from Kew, Victoria